The Star Plaza Theatre (formerly known as the Holiday Star Theatre) was a live music venue located in Merrillville, Indiana. The theatre was a 3,400-seat intimate venue with two seating levels in a semicircle around the stage. The Main Floor Level sat 2,000 people, and the Mezzanine Level, which overhangs the main level about midway, sat 1,400. The furthest seat in the auditorium was 120 feet from the stage.

The Star Plaza Theatre closed on December 17, 2017 after its final show with the only group to perform every year that the theater was open, The Oak Ridge Boys. The final song sung on the stage was "Amazing Grace". Demolition lasted throughout summer 2018.

Entertainers who appeared there included Christina Aguilera, Anita Baker, The Beach Boys, Tony Bennett, Garth Brooks, Captain & Tennille, Ray Charles,  Kenny Chesney, Phil Collins, Perry Como, Alice Cooper, Bill Cosby, Miles Davis, Sammy Davis, Jr., Ellen DeGeneres,  John Denver, Duran Duran, Bob Dylan, Jamie Foxx, Aretha Franklin, Mitzi Gaynor, The Go-Go's, Bob Hope, Whitney Houston, Jennifer Hudson, Julio Iglesias, Rick James, Tom Jones, R. Kelly, B.B. King, Gladys Knight, Patti LaBelle, Jay Leno, Liberace, Barry Manilow,  Reba McEntire, Bette Midler,  Liza Minnelli, The Monkees, Motley CrueWayne Newton, Robert Palmer, Dolly Parton, Richard Pryor, REO Speedwagon, Joan Rivers, Kenny Rogers, Diana Ross, Jerry Seinfeld, Red Skelton, Squeeze,Ken Mate Donna Summer, Tiffany, James Taylor,  The Temptations, Tina Turner, Luther Vandross, Stevie Ray Vaughan,  Dionne Warwick, Andy Williams, "Weird Al" Yankovic, Warren Zevon, ZZ Top, Nancy Wilson, and many more.

External links

References

Music venues in Indiana
Theatres in Indiana
Buildings and structures in Lake County, Indiana
Tourist attractions in Lake County, Indiana